Nasr ibn Shabath al-Uqayli was the leader of a rebellion of the Qays tribe in the Jazira against the central Abbasid government during the civil war of the Fourth Fitna.

Life 
Nasr appears in 811/812, when Caliph al-Amin sent his general, Abd al-Malik ibn Salih, to Syria to recruit troops for the civil war against his brother, al-Ma'mun.

As the civil war continued, the Abbasid government's hold on the region of Syria, the Jazira and other provinces collapsed, with local magnates taking hold of the cities and districts as autonomous rulers. Nasr and his followers did not oppose the Abbasids or Caliph al-Ma'mun outright, but rather sought to defend the traditional position of the Arab tribes against what they saw as the increasing domination of the Abbasid government by the mostly Iranian supporters (derisively called  by the Arabs) of al-Ma'mun.

Nasr was heavily involved in the power struggles of the region. Thus when the tribe of Tanukh tried to take the city of Aleppo from the Salih family, a branch of the Abbasids, Nasr and his ally Abbas came to the aid of the latter, defeating and dispersing the Tanukh. In 812, he assaulted Harran, threatening to destroy its great Christian church, and left only after receiving a payment of 5,000 dirhams in ransom. In 814, al-Ma'mun appointed Tahir ibn Husayn to subdue Nasr and his followers. Tahir at first made Harran his base, but the unruliness of his troops forced him to flee at night and encamp at Raqqa, which became his base of operations. Despite his ability, Tahir failed to make any progress against Nasr and the Arab tribesmen, who continued to raid and terrorize the region for a further decade.

When Tahir was appointed governor of Khurasan and the eastern caliphate in 821, he left Syria and the Jazira in the hands of his son Abdallah ibn Tahir al-Khurasani. Over the next five years, Abdallah gradually reduced Nasr's territory and killed off his followers, until he was driven to his last refuge, the fortress of Kaysum. In the end, in 824 or 825, Nasr was forced to offer his surrender in exchange for a document guaranteeing his safety—preserved by al-Tabari along with a letter sent to him exhorting him to lay down arms—a request which was granted by al-Ma'mun. The fortress of Kaysum was torn down by Abdallah, and Nasr was brought to Baghdad. Nothing is known of him thereafter.

See also
List of people who disappeared

References

Sources
 
 
 
 
 
 
 

8th-century births
9th-century Arabs
9th-century deaths
Arab rebels
Banu Uqayl
Fourth Fitna
Missing person cases in Iraq
Rebels from the Abbasid Caliphate
Upper Mesopotamia under the Abbasid Caliphate